Martín Adjemián (December 12, 1932 – January 3, 2006) was an Argentine film and television actor of Armenian descent.  He worked in the cinema of Argentina.

He died on January 3, 2006, of cancer.

In 1988 he appeared in Asesinato a distancia.

One of his most recent role was in the critically acclaimed film La Ciénaga (2001).

Filmography (partial)
 Invasión (1969).
 Adela (2000) as Enríquez
 La Ciénaga (2001) aka The Swamp
 Gallito Ciego (2001)
 Herencia (2001) aka Inheritance
 Potestad (2002)
 Palermo Hollywood (2004)
 Tiempo de valientes (2005)
 La Perrera (2006) aka The Dog Pound

Television (partial)
 1000 millones (2002) TV Series aka Love Heritage
 Sol negro (2003) (Mini TV Series)
 Sangre fría (2004) (Mini TV Series)

References

External links
 
 

1932 births
2006 deaths
Argentine male actors
Argentine people of Armenian descent
Argentine male film actors
Male actors from Buenos Aires
Deaths from cancer in Argentina